The Crayford Kestrels were a  Speedway team which operated from 1968 until their closure in 1983. They were based at Crayford & Bexleyheath Stadium in Crayford.

History
Crayford were founder members of British League Division Two in 1968 and finished in sixth place in its inaugural season.

The team were known as the Crayford Highwaymen from 1968 until 1970 but were disbanded after the 1970 season. Speedway returned to the stadium in 1975 with a team nicknamed the Kestrels. They competed for nine years, with their most successful season being the third place finish during the 1983 National League season although they did win the Four-Team Championship in 1980.

The team were forced to relocate for the 1984 season as the stadium was sold for redevelopment and for the 1984 season the team transferred the promotion to Hackney and ran a team called the Hackney Kestrels.

Season summary

See also
List of defunct motorcycle speedway teams in the United Kingdom

References

Defunct British speedway teams
Sport in Kent